George Nardone (born June 13, 1964) is an American politician and a Republican member of the Rhode Island House of Representatives representing District 28 beginning in 2019. He serves on the House Committees on Corporations, Small Business, Municipal Government, and Special Legislation.

Education
Nardone is a 1982 graduate of Scituate High School.

Electoral record

Personal life 
Nardone is a resident of Coventry, Rhode Island.

References

External links
Official page at the Rhode Island General Assembly

George Nardone at Ballotpedia

1964 births
Living people
Republican Party members of the Rhode Island House of Representatives
People from Coventry, Rhode Island
21st-century American politicians